Jorge Luis Félix "Campolo" Alcalde Millos (5 December 1916 – 25 June 1990) was a Peruvian professional footballer. He played as a striker, and was especially noted for his time spent with the Peru national football team. He was part of Peru's squad at the 1936 Summer Olympics.

Biography
Alcalde was included in the Peru national football team for the Copa America 1939 that won. He was the second highest goal scorer with 5 goals. He made 15 appearances and scored 13 goals for the Peru national team. The Peruvian newspaper El Comercio and El Callao considered him the best soccer player of the Copa America 1939.

Honors

Team

Individual awards

Peruvian League: Top Scorer 1935, 1938
Bolivarian Games Top Scorer: 1938

References

1916 births
1990 deaths
Sportspeople from Callao
Peruvian footballers
Peru international footballers
Footballers at the 1936 Summer Olympics
Olympic footballers of Peru
Sport Boys footballers
Club Atlético River Plate footballers
Club Atlético Banfield footballers
Talleres de Remedios de Escalada footballers
Liverpool F.C. (Montevideo) players
Deportivo Municipal footballers
Club Universitario de Deportes footballers
Argentine Primera División players
Peruvian Primera División players
Peruvian expatriate footballers
Expatriate footballers in Argentina
Expatriate footballers in Uruguay
Association football forwards
Copa América-winning players